Vishnuvardhan Goud Panjala (born 11 February 2001) is an Indian badminton player. He was part of the India team that won the 2022 Thomas Cup He is currently ranked 32 in the world ranking in the men's doubles event.

Achievements

BWF World Tour (2 runners-up) 
The BWF World Tour, which was announced on 19 March 2017 and implemented in 2018, is a series of elite badminton tournaments sanctioned by the Badminton World Federation (BWF). The BWF World Tours are divided into levels of World Tour Finals, Super 1000, Super 750, Super 500, Super 300 (part of the HSBC World Tour), and the BWF Tour Super 100

Men's doubles

BWF International Challenge/Series (2 titles, 1 runner-up) 
Men's doubles

  BWF International Challenge tournament
  BWF International Series tournament
  BWF Future Series tournament

BWF Junior International (1 runner-up) 
Boys' doubles

  BWF Junior International Grand Prix tournament
  BWF Junior International Challenge tournament
  BWF Junior International Series tournament
  BWF Junior Future Series tournament

References 

Living people
2001 births
Indian male badminton players